{{DISPLAYTITLE:C19H25NO2}}
The molecular formula C19H25NO2 (molar mass: 299.41 g/mol, exact mass: 299.1885 u) may refer to:

 Buphenine
 Ethylketazocine (WIN-35,197-2)
 Proxorphan

Molecular formulas